Neville Devonshire Sandelson (27 November 1923 – 12 January 2002) was a British politician.

Early life
Sandelson was educated at Westminster School and Trinity College, Cambridge. He was a barrister, called to the bar by Inner Temple in 1946, and director of a publishing company. He was elected to the London County Council in 1952, representing Stoke Newington and Hackney North and was a council member of Toynbee Hall and the Fabian Society.

Parliamentary career
Sandelson unsuccessfully attempted to enter Parliament many times before he finally gained election. He contested Ashford in 1950, 1951 and 1955, the Beckenham by-election in 1957 and Rushcliffe in 1959. He might have won the seat of Heston and Isleworth at the 1966 general election from Reader Harris, its Conservative MP, had it not been for a strong Liberal vote. Additionally he also lost the Leicester South West seat in a 1967 by-election, and finally fought Chichester at the subsequent election.

He was elected Labour Party Member of Parliament (MP) for Hayes and Harlington in a 1971 by-election. Later in the decade he survived a number of attempts to de-select him and seemed to relish the role of the beleaguered right wing Labour MP. In October 1980 he was so unhappy at the Labour Party Conference's support for unilateral disarmament that he announced that he would vote with the Tories on all defence issues. In 1981, he was among the Labour MPs who defected to the new Social Democratic Party. Sandelson later said that he had decided to join the party months before, and had voted for Michael Foot in the Labour leadership election in order to ensure Labour had an unelectable leader.

After Parliament
In 1983 he lost his seat, polling 29% of the vote - although he almost pushed Labour into third place which allowed the Conservative candidate Terry Dicks to win. When the 1987 general election came round he did not stand and endorsed a number of Conservative candidates as a means of defeating Labour though the list included Chris Patten whose seat was a prime SDP-Liberal Alliance target which Labour had no chance of winning. Despite the above activities he was allowed to rejoin the Labour Party in 1996, then under the leadership of Tony Blair, who appealed to Sandelson's centrist values. He stayed with Labour until his death in 2002 aged 78.

References

Bibliography
Times Guide to the House of Commons, 1955, 1966 & 1983

Obituary, The Independent, 16 January 2002.

External links 

Catalogue of the Sandelson papers held at LSE Archives

1923 births
2002 deaths
Labour Party (UK) MPs for English constituencies
Social Democratic Party (UK) MPs for English constituencies
Members of London County Council
UK MPs 1970–1974
UK MPs 1974
UK MPs 1974–1979
UK MPs 1979–1983
People educated at Westminster School, London
Jewish British politicians
Presidents of the Cambridge Union